Pale is a census town in North Goa district in the Indian state of Goa.

Geography
It has an average elevation of 0 metres (0 feet).

Demographics
 India census, Pale had a population of 5706. Males constitute 53% of the population and females 47%. Pale has an average literacy rate of 75%, higher than the national average of 59.5%: male literacy is 82%, and female literacy is 67%. In Pale, 10% of the population is under 6 years of age.

References

Cities and towns in North Goa district